N,N-Dimethylphenethylamine (N,N-DMPEA) is a substituted phenethylamine that is used as a flavoring agent. It is an alkaloid that was first isolated from the orchid Eria jarensis.   Its aroma is described as "sweet, fishy". It is mainly used in cereal, cheese, dairy products, fish, fruit and meat. It is also being used in pre-workout and bodybuilding supplements with claims of a stimulant effect.

There is also evidence suggesting that N,N-DMPEA acts as a TAAR1 agonist in humans, and as a 5-HT1A ligand in rats. Some less conclusive research also indicated that it had interaction with MAO-B, most likely as an enzyme substrate and not an inhibitor.

N,N-DMPEA is a positional isomer of methamphetamine.

Safety
N,N-DMPEA has been found to be safe for use as a flavoring agent by the Flavor and Extract Manufacturers Association (FEMA) Expert Panel and also by the Joint Expert Committee on Food Additives (JECFA)—a collaboration between the Food and Agricultural Organization of the United Nations (FAO) and the World Health Organization.

References

Phenethylamine alkaloids
Food additives